The Netherlands competed at the 1988 Summer Olympics in Seoul, Republic of Korea. 147 competitors, 93 men and 54 women, took part in 86 events in 17 sports.

Medalists

Competitors
The following is the list of number of competitors in the Games.

Archery

Martinus Reniers made his third appearance for the Netherlands in archery.  He had his best finish yet, advancing to the final and ending up in 5th place.  The Dutch women, both new to Olympic competition, were not as successful.

Athletics

 Men
 Track & road events

Men's Marathon
 Gerard Nijboer
 Final — 2"14:40 (→ 13th place)

 Marti ten Kate
 Final — 2"14:53 (→ 15th place)

Men's 3.000 m Steeplechase
 Hans Koeleman
 Heat — 8:35.20
 Semi Final — 8:21.86 (→ did not advance)

Men's Discus Throw
 Erik de Bruin
 Qualification — 61.66m
 Final — 63.06m (→ 9th place)

Men's Long Jump
 Emiel Mellaard
 Qualification — 8.02m
 Final — 7.71m (→ 11th place)

Men's Decathlon
 Robert de Wit — 8189 points (→ 8th place)
 100 metres — 11.05s
 Long Jump — 6.95m
 Shot Put — 15.34m
 High Jump — 2.00m
 400 metres — 48.21s
 110m Hurdles — 14.36s
 Discus Throw — 41.32m
 Pole Vault — 4.80m
 Javelin Throw — 63.00m
 1.500 metres — 4:25.86s

Women's 100 metres
 Nelli Cooman
 Heat 1 — 11.22s
 Heat 2 — 11.08s
 Semi Final — 11.13s (→ did not advance)

 Els Scharn
 Heat 1 — 11.38s
 Heat 2 — 11.51s (→ did not advance)

Women's 400 metres
 Yvonne van Dorp
 Heat 1 — 52.84s
 Heat 2 — 53.50s (→ did not advance)

Women's 1.500 metres
 Elly van Hulst
 Heat — 4:07.40 (→ did not advance)

Women's 3.000 metres
 Elly van Hulst
 Heat — 8:48.54
 Final — 8:43.92 (→ 9th place)

Women's Marathon
 Carla Beurskens
 Final — 2'37:52 (→ 34th place)

Women's 100m Hurdles
 Marjan Olyslager
 Heat 1 — 13.04s
 Heat 2 — 13.02s
 Semi Final — 13.08s (→ did not advance)

 Gretha Tromp
 Heat 1 — 13.48s
 Heat 2 — 13.42s (→ did not advance)

Women's 400m Hurdles
 Gretha Tromp
 Heat 1 — 56.11s
 Semi Final — 57.57s (→ did not advance)

Women's 4 × 100 m Relay
 Nelli Cooman, Gretha Tromp, Marjan Olyslager, and Els Scharn
 Heat 1 — 43.96s
 Semi Final — 43.48s (→ did not advance)

Women's Long Jump
 Marjon Wijnsma
 Qualification — 6.39m (→ did not advance)

Women's Heptathlon
 Marjon Wijnsma
 Final Round — 6205 points (→ 11th place)

Boxing

Men's Featherweight (57 kg)
 Regilio Tuur
 First Round — Defeated Kelcie Banks (USA) on knock-out
 Second Round — Defeated John Wanjau (Kenya) on points
 Third Round — Defeated David Anderson (Great Britain) on points
 Quarter Finals — Lost to Daniel Dumitrescu (Romania) on points

Men's Heavyweight (91 kg)
 Arnold Vanderlyde →  Bronze Medal
 First Round — Bye
 Second Round — Defeated Henry Akinwande (Great Britain) on points
 Quarter Finals — Defeated Gyula Alvics (Hungary) on points
 Semi Finals — Lost to Ray Mercer (USA) after referee stopped contest

Canoeing

Cycling

Thirteen cyclists, ten men and three women, represented the Netherlands in 1988. Monique Knol won gold in the women's road race.

Men's road race
 Michel Zanoli — 4:32:56 (→ 15th place)
 Rob Harmeling — 4:32:56 (→ 38th place)
 Tom Cordes — 4:32:56 (→ 42nd place)

Men's team time trial
 Tom Cordes
 Gerrit de Vries
 Maarten den Bakker
 Michel Zanoli

Men's 1 km time trial
 Thierry Détant

Men's individual pursuit
 Erik Cent

Men's team pursuit
 Marcel Beumer
 Erik Cent
 Leo Peelen
 Mario van Baarle

Men's points race
 Leo Peelen

Women's road race
 Monique Knol — 2:00:52 (→  Gold Medal)
 Heleen Hage — 2:00:52 (→ 19th place)
 Cora Westland — 2:01:50 (→ 46th place)

Diving

Men's 3m Springboard
Edwin Jongejans — 588.330 points (→ 8th place)

Women's 3m Springboard
Daphne Jongejans — 465.450 points (→ 8th place)

Equestrian

Fencing

Five fencers, all male, represented the Netherlands in 1988.

Men's épée
 Stéphane Ganeff
 Arwin Kardolus
 Michiel Driessen

Men's team épée
 Paul Besselink, Michiel Driessen, Stéphane Ganeff, Arwin Kardolus, Olaf Kardolus

Hockey

Judo

Rowing

Sailing

Shooting

Swimming

Men's 50m Freestyle
 Hans Kroes
 Heat — 23.50 (→ did not advance, 20th place)

Men's 100m Freestyle
 Hans Kroes
 Heat — 51.65 (→ did not advance, 29th place)

 Patrick Dybiona
 Heat — 51.79 (→ did not advance, 30th place)

Men's 200m Freestyle
 Patrick Dybiona
 Heat — 1:52.67 (→ did not advance, 24th place)

Men's 100m Breaststroke
 Ron Dekker
 Heat — 1:03.08
 B-Final — 1:03.22 (→ 10th place)

Men's 200m Breaststroke
 Ron Dekker
 Heat — 2:20.84 (→ did not advance, 26th place)

Men's 100m Butterfly
 Frank Drost
 Heat — 55.38 (→ did not advance, 19th place)

Men's 200m Butterfly
 Frank Drost
 Heat — 2:00.99
 B-Final — 2:01.59 (→ 14th place)

Men's 4 × 100 m Freestyle Relay
 Frank Drost, Patrick Dybiona, Hans Kroes, and Ron Dekker
 Heat — 3:25.26 (→ did not advance, 11th place)

Men's 4 × 100 m Medley Relay
 Hans Kroes, Ron Dekker, Frank Drost, and Patrick Dybiona
 Heat — 3:45.65
 Final — 3:46.55 (→ 7th place)

Women's 50m Freestyle
 Karin Brienesse
 Heat — 26.54
 B-Final — 26.66 (→ 15th place)

 Diana van der Plaats
 Heat — 26.49
 B-Final — 26.80 (→ 16th place)

Women's 100m Freestyle
 Karin Brienesse
 Heat — 56.29
 Final — 56.15 (→ 6th place)

 Conny van Bentum
 Heat — 56.50
 Final — 56.54 (→ 8th place)

Women's 200m Freestyle
 Diana van der Plaats
 Heat — 2:03.02 (→ did not advance, 17th place)

 Karin Brienesse
 Heat — 2:04.36 (→ did not advance, 22nd place)

Women's 100m Backstroke
 Jolanda de Rover
 Heat — 1:04.39
 B-Final — 1:04.11 (→ 14th place)

Women's 200m Backstroke
 Jolanda de Rover
 Heat — 2:16.58
 Final — 2:15.17 (→ 7th place)

Women's 100m Breaststroke
 Linda Moes
 Heat — 1:11.84 (→ did not advance, 17th place)

Women's 200m Breaststroke
 Linda Moes
 Heat — 2:31.98
 B-Final — 2:30.83 (→ 11th place)

Women's 100m Butterfly
 Conny van Bentum
 Heat — 1:00.94
 Final — 1:00.62 (→ 6th place)

Women's 200m Butterfly
 Conny van Bentum
 Heat — 2:12.41
 Final — 2:13.17 (→ 8th place)

Women's 200m Individual Medley
 Marianne Muis
 Heat — 2:16.60
 Final — 2:16.40 (→ 5th place)

 Mildred Muis
 Heat — 2:19.46
 B-Final — 2:17.73 (→ 9th place)

Women's 400m Individual Medley
 Marianne Muis
 Heat — 4:56.31 (→ did not advance, 20th place)

 Mildred Muis
 Heat — 4:56.89 (→ did not advance, 21st place)

Women's 4 × 100 m Freestyle Relay
  Conny van Bentum, Marianne Muis, Mildred Muis, and Diana van der Plaats
 Heat — 3:44.12
 Marianne Muis, Mildred Muis, Conny van Bentum, and Karin Brienesse
 Final — 3:43.39 (→ Silver Medal)

Women's 4 × 100 m Medley Relay
 Jolanda de Rover, Linda Moes, Conny van Bentum, and Karin Brienesse
 Heat — 4:11.82
 Final — 4:12.19 (→ 5th place)

Table tennis

Tennis

Men's Singles Competition
 Michiel Schapers
 First round — Defeated Andrei Chesnokov (Soviet Union) 6-3, 5-7, 6-0, 6-2
 Second round — Defeated Tony Mmoh (Nigeria) 4-6, 6-3, 6-1, 4-6, 6-1
 Third round — Defeated Sergio Casal (Spain) 6-4, 4-6, 2-6, 6-3, 6-4
 Quarter Finals — Lost to Miloslav Mečíř (Czechoslovakia) 6-3, 6-7, 2-6, 4-6

Volleyball

Men's team competition
Preliminary round (group B)
 Defeated France (3-1)
 Lost to the United States (1-3)
 Defeated Tunisia (3-0)
 Lost to Argentina (0-3)
 Defeated Japan (3-0)
Classification Matches
 5th/8th place: Defeated Sweden (3-2)
 5th/6th place: Defeated Bulgaria (3-0) → Fifth place

Team roster
Edwin Benne
Peter Blangé
Ron Boudrie
Marco Brouwers
Teun Buijs
Rob Grabert
Pieter Jan Leeuwerink
Jan Posthuma
Avital Selinger
Martin Teffer
Ronald Zoodsma
Ron Zwerver
Head coach: Arie Selinger

Demonstration events
 Annemiek van den Boogaart-Dagelet (bowling)

References

Nations at the 1988 Summer Olympics
1988
S